Sayles is an English surname. Notable people with the surname include:

Bill Sayles (1917–1996), American baseball player
Charlie Sayles (born 1948), American Chicago blues harmonicist, singer and songwriter
Emanuel Sayles (1907–1986), American musician
G. O. Sayles (1901–1994), English historian
George Sayles (1899–1971), English professional footballer and cricketer
Irving Sayles (1872–1914), American entertainer
John Sayles (born 1950), American director

English-language surnames